Qarrah Dagh (also Romanized as Qarrah Dāgh and Qareh Dāgh; also known as Karadag and Qara Dāgh) is a village in Golabar Rural District, in the Central District of Ijrud County, Zanjan Province, Iran. At the 2006 census, its population was 131, in 32 families.

References 

Populated places in Ijrud County